List of English football transfers 2002–03 include:

List of English football transfers summer 2002
List of English football transfers winter 2002–03
List of English football transfers summer 2003

Transfers
2002